The Earlsfort Terrace Tournament a late Victorian era hard court tennis tournament staged first staged on 28 April 1879. The tournament was held on the lawn tennis grounds Earlsfort Terrace, Dublin, Ireland. The tournament was held only one time and ended on 2 May 1878 at.

History
The Earlsfort Terrace Tournament was hard court tennis event first staged in on 28 April 1879. This tournament was held for one edition only and appeared to have ended. This event was held at Earlsfort Terrace in central Dublin, Ireland. The singles title was won by Vere St. Leger Goold.

References

Sources
 Carlow Sentinel. (12 April 1879) Carlow, Republic of Ireland: British Newspaper Archives. 
 Irish Times. (23 April 1879) Dublin, Republic of Ireland: British Newspaper Archives.  
 Nieuwland, Alex. "Edition – Earlsfort Terrace Tournament 1879". www.tennisarchives.com. Tennis Archives.

Republic of Ireland
1879 establishments in Ireland
Hard court tennis tournaments
Sport in County Dublin
Tennis tournaments in Ireland